Krista Shereé Walton (born c.1977) is an American chemical engineer. She is the Robert "Bud" Moeller Faculty Fellow and professor of chemical and biomolecular engineering and the associate dean for research and innovation in the College of Engineering at the Georgia Institute of Technology.

Background and education
Walton grew up on her family's farm in Killen, Alabama, and graduated from Brooks High School in 1995. She completed her B.S.E. in chemical and materials engineering from the University of Alabama in Huntsville in 2000 and obtained her Ph.D. in chemical engineering from Vanderbilt University in 2005 under the direction of M. Douglas LeVan. Walton was awarded an Alternative Energy Fellowship by the American Chemical Society Petroleum Research Fund in 2005 and completed postdoctoral research with Randall Q. Snurr in Chemical & Biological Engineering at Northwestern University from 2005 to 2006.

Academic career 
Walton began her faculty career at Kansas State University as an assistant professor of chemical engineering in 2006. She won several prestigious research awards during that time, including the Presidential Early Career Award for Scientists and Engineers (PECASE) in 2007. Walton moved to the School of Chemical & Biomolecular Engineering at Georgia Tech as an assistant professor in 2009. She received tenure in 2012 and was promoted to the rank of full professor in 2016. Walton became the founding director and lead principal investigator of Georgia Tech's DOE Energy Frontier Research Center UNCAGE-ME in 2014 and led her team to a renewal in 2018. She has served as Associate Editor for the ACS journal Industrial & Engineering Chemistry Research since 2014 and has been active in the Separations Division of AIChE for over 15 years. Walton served as Treasurer in the International Adsorption Society 2010-2015 and was the co-chair of the 14th International Conference on the Fundamentals of Adsorption (FOA14) held in the US in 2022.  Walton was recently selected into the 2020 cohort of the Defense Science Study Group (DSSG) and will serve a two-year term from 2022-2024 after COVID delayed the start of the program. The DSSG is directed by the non-profit Institute for Defense Analyses (IDA) and is sponsored by the Defense Advanced Research Projects Agency (DARPA). Walton serves as the associate dean for research in the College of Engineering at Georgia Tech, having been appointed to the role in 2019.

Research interests 
Research in the Walton Group focuses on the design, synthesis, and characterization of functional porous materials for use in chemical separations. Applications of interest include CO2 capture, air purification, natural gas upgrading, and atmospheric water harvesting. Her group is particularly interested in the behavior and modeling of complex mixture adsorption and seeks to develop structure-property relationships for adsorption and chemical stability of metal-organic frameworks. She has mentored 21 Ph.D. graduates from her group and published over 100 peer-reviewed articles. She has also written several book chapters and is a co-author of Chapter 16: Adsorption and Ion Exchange in the recent 9th edition of Perry's Chemical Engineers' Handbook. Walton is active in the research community and has presented over 100 keynotes, plenary lectures, and invited seminars.

Awards and recognition
Fellow of the International Adsorption Society, 2021
Ernest Orlando Lawrence Award, 2021
Selected to 2020–2021 cohort of the Defense Science Study Group (DSSG)
AIChE FRI/John G. Kunesh Award for Excellence in Separations Research, 2016
University of Alabama-Huntsville Alumni of Achievement Award, 2015
ACS Women Chemists Committee Rising Star Award, 2015
UAH College of Engineering Distinguished Speaker, 2015
International Adsorption Society Award for Excellence in Publications by a Young Member of the Society (Inaugural Award), 2013
Kavli Fellow, National Academy of Sciences (NAS) German-American Frontiers of Science Symposium (GAFOS), Meeting Chair (U.S. side), 2012
Young Scientist Delegation, IAP/World Economic Forum's "Summer Davos" in Dalian, People's Republic of China, Invitee (1 of 2 US Young Scientists chosen after nomination by the US National Academies), 2011
National Science Foundation CAREER Award, 2009 
Presidential Early Career Award for Scientists and Engineers (PECASE), DoD Recipient, 2007
Army Research Office Young Investigator Program (YIP) Award, 2007
American Chemical Society Petroleum Research Fund Alternative Energy Postdoctoral Fellowship, 2005
AIChE Separations Division Graduate Research Award, Adsorption and Ion Exchange, 2005 
IBM Graduate Fellowship, 2000-2005

References

Living people
21st-century American engineers
American chemical engineers
Georgia Tech faculty
Vanderbilt University alumni
University of Alabama in Huntsville alumni
American women engineers
Kansas State University faculty
1970s births
People from Killen, Alabama
People from Florence, Alabama
Engineers from Alabama
American women academics
21st-century American women